Faisal Bagh (also known as Faisal Park) is a union council located in the Ravi Zone of Lahore, Punjab, Pakistan. The total population of Kot Begum is 69,758 and predominantly consists of unplanned settlement/infrastructure along the N-5 National Highway.

Localities
 Haji Kot
 Ali Bagh (Ali Park)
 Javed Bagh (Javed Park)
 Jameel Bagh (Jameel Park)
 Shahrak-e-Barkat (Barkat Town)

References

Ravi Zone